Silver Creek Airport  is an airport serving the Stann Creek District, Belize.

Airlines and destinations

See also

Transport in Belize
List of airports in Belize

References

External links 
OpenStreetMap - Silver Creek Airport
OurAirports - Silver Creek Airport

Aerodromes in Belize - pdf

Airports in Belize
Stann Creek District